Bryan Bruce (born 1948) is a New Zealand documentary maker and author. Born in Scotland in 1948, he emigrated with his family to New Zealand in 1956. He grew up in Christchurch and attended the University of Canterbury, where he graduated with a M.A. in sociology and philosophy. Bruce earned a Diploma in Teaching from Christchurch Teachers' College and taught for 10 years. He was a professional musician for 20 years before he took up a career as a documentary maker. Bruce now resides in Auckland, New Zealand.

Bruce's feature-length documentaries cover diverse topics, from natural history to crime.

Bruce wrote, produced and directed the real crime show The Investigator  that screened on TV ONE (Television New Zealand) and CBS Reality.

Publications
Bruce's published non-fiction works include the following:

A Taste of History (Batemans, 2007)
Hard cases (Random House, New Zealand, 2008)
Historia Smaku (Cartablanca, 2000); 
Jesus: The Cold Case (Random House, New Zealand, 2010); 
Jezus: Dowody Zbrodni (Cartablanca, Poland, 2011);

Awards

2011 Winner Aotearoa Film and Television Awards Awards Best Documentary- Jesus: The Cold Case.
2008 Winner  Qantas Awards Achievement in Directing. Finalist:  Best Factual Entertainment Series.
2003 Finalist New York Festivals Television Programming Awards(Writer, Director Producer for The Lost Dinosaurs).
2003 Banff Television Festival Award Finalist (The Lost Dinosaurs).
2002 Winner- Best Director Factual Entertainment (New Zealand Television Awards)
Jesus: The Cold Case: A 90-minute documentary  for TVNZ. Won AFTA for Best Documentary plus Silver and Bronze Medals in Religion and History categories at The New York Festivals Television and Film Awards. Awarded despite apparent initial TVNZ reluctance to release, and subsequent criticism from some reviewers.

Documentaries

A number of Bruce's documentaries are lodged at The New Zealand Film Archive.

References

1948 births
Living people
New Zealand film directors
New Zealand television directors
New Zealand writers
People from Wellington City
New Zealand people of Scottish descent
Scottish expatriates in New Zealand
University of Canterbury alumni